Lars Gunnar Johnsen (born 2 July 1991) is a Norwegian former footballer.

Johnsen was born in Silsand.

Career

HamKam
Johnsen signed for HamKam on 22 December 2018.

Career statistics

References

External links
Profile at Hamkam

1991 births
Living people
People from Lenvik
Norwegian footballers
Association football midfielders
Tromsdalen UIL players
Tromsø IL players
Hamarkameratene players
Norwegian First Division players
Norwegian Second Division players
Eliteserien players
FK Senja players
Sportspeople from Troms og Finnmark